Johann Sithmann (1602–1666) was a German jurist, Professor of Pedagogy at the University of Greifswald and author, known from the 1657 publication Idea Arboris Consanguinitatis & Affinitatis Theoreticae & Practicae, and other works.

Publications 
 1654. Disputatio ex jure publico de comitiis imperii Romano-Germanici
 1654. Nucleus Pandectarum paratitlaris : praemissâ ad singulos quinquaginta libros tabulâ generali & singulorum librorum tabulis specialibus, qua seriem materiarum cognos cendam apprime utilibs, ex texta legum historia chronologica iure.
 1657. Idea Arboris Consanguinitatis & Affinitatis Theoreticae & Practicae.
 1657. Idea iuris episcopalis moderni : quomodo praesertim in ecclesiis Augustanae confessionis jus episcopale constituatur: in personis episcopum eligentibus ... ; in singularem nostrorum consistoriorum & ecclesiarum utilitatem noviter exhibita 
 1661. Johannis Sithmanni speculum imperii Romani : ab origine urbis de eius regimine, magistratibus, patribus, plebe, iurisconsultis, deque iuris continuatione ad Iustinianum et inde de origine iurium Gothicorum, Longobardorum, de iure doctorum et academiarum, accessione iuris feudalis, canonici, iurisque publici introductione, transactione Passaviensi, pacificatione religiosa et capitulatione Caesarea ; Varie et chronologice continuatum.

References 

1602 births
1666 deaths
17th-century German writers
German non-fiction writers
German educational theorists
Jurists from Mecklenburg-Western Pomerania
Academic staff of the University of Greifswald
German male non-fiction writers
17th-century German male writers